The House of Hohenberg is an Austrian and Czech noble family that descends from Countess Sophie Chotek (1868–1914), who in 1900 married Archduke Francis Ferdinand of Austria-Este (1863–1914), the heir presumptive to the throne of the Austro-Hungarian Empire. As their marriage was a morganatic one, none of their children were in the line of succession to the Austro-Hungarian throne. Still, they represent the senior agnatic line of the House of Habsburg-Lorraine.

The head of the house bears the title of duke with the style of Highness, with all other members titled as princes and princesses with the style of Serene Highness.

Establishment and history
The House of Hohenberg was established by imperial decree of Emperor Francis Joseph of Austria when, upon the couple's marriage in 1900, he created Francis Ferdinand's wife Fürstin von Hohenberg (Princess of Hohenberg) in her own right with the style of Durchlaucht (Serene Highness) and the specification that this name and title should also be borne by her descendants.

In 1909, the Emperor raised Sophie to the more senior title of Herzogin von Hohenberg (Duchess of Hohenberg) with the superior style of Hoheit (Highness). Since that title had been granted ad personam, it expired upon Sophie's assassination in 1914.

In 1917, Emperor Charles of Austria granted the eldest son of Francis Ferdinand and Sophie the title of duke with the style of Highness. The other members of the family retained the titles of prince and princesses with the lesser style of Serene Highness. Thus, Maximilian became the first Duke of Hohenberg, with the dukedom being hereditary according to primogeniture in the male line. Following the collapse of the monarchy, the Austrian nobility, along with hereditary titles and such nobiliary particles as von, were abolished by law in 1919.

In 1938, several members of the family who were opposed to Adolf Hitler were arrested by the Nazis and sent to Dachau concentration camp, most notably Maximilian and his brother Ernst. The former head of the family, Georg, was ambassador of the Republic of Austria to the Holy See during part of the pontificate of Pope John Paul II. He was also a Knight of the Golden Fleece.

Members of the Hohenberg family are not only descended from, and married into, the House of Habsburg-Lorraine, but are also related through marriage to several other European dynasties, including the Grand Ducal Family of Luxembourg and the Princely Family of Liechtenstein.  They also descend from King George II of Great Britain through his daughter Anne, Princess Royal and Princess of Orange and are therefore distantly related to the British Royal Family.

Residences 

The Hohenberg family still owns Artstetten Castle in Lower Austria, and parts of this castle are open to the public for visits. Former residences of the family include Konopiště château in Bohemia.

Artstetten Castle was selected to provide the main theme for an Austrian 10 euro commemorative coin, minted on 13 October 2004.  The reverse shows the entrance to the crypt of the Hohenberg family. There are two portraits on the left, showing Archduke Francis Ferdinand and his wife Sophie, Duchess of Hohenberg.

Duchess of Hohenberg (1909–1914) 
 Sophie (1868–1914), previously Princess of Hohenberg from the time of her marriage in 1900.

Dukes of Hohenberg (1917–present)

 Maximilian (1902–1962), 1st Duke, eldest son of Sophie; with issue.
 Franz (1927–1977), 2nd Duke, eldest son of Maximilian; with issue.
 Georg (1929–2019), 3rd Duke, second son of Maximilian; with issue.
 Nikolaus (born 1961), 4th Duke, eldest son of Georg; with issue.

Line of succession to the ducal title 

The line of succession to the title of Duke of Hohenberg is as follows:

Sophie, Duchess of Hohenberg (1868–1914)
 Maximilian, Duke of Hohenberg (1902–1962)
 Franz, Duke of Hohenberg (1927–1977)
 Georg, Duke of Hohenberg (1929–2019)
 Nikolaus, Duke of Hohenberg (b. 1961)
 (1) Prince Karl of Hohenberg (b. 1991), heir apparent
 (2) Prince Felix of Hohenberg (b. 2022)
 (3) Prince Maximilian of Hohenberg (b. 1970)
 (4) Prince Nikolaus of Hohenberg (b. 2001)
 (5) Prince Leopold of Hohenberg (b. 2006)
 Prince Albrecht of Hohenberg (1931–2021)
 (6) Prince Leo Johannes of Hohenberg (b. 1964)
 (7) Prince Adrien of Hohenberg (b. 2003)
 Prince Johannes of Hohenberg (1933–2003)
 (8) Prince Stephan of Hohenberg (b. 1972)
 (9) Prince Nepomuk of Hohenberg (b. 2005)
 (10) Prince Georg of Hohenberg (b. 1975)
 Prince Peter of Hohenberg (1936–2017)
 Prince Gerhard of Hohenberg (1941–2019)
 Prince Ernst of Hohenberg (1904–1954)
 Prince Franz Ferdinand of Hohenberg (1937–1978)
 (11) Prince Franz Ferdinand of Hohenberg (b. 1969)
 (12) Prince Maximilian of Hohenberg (b. 2001)
 '' Prince Ernst of Hohenberg (1944–2023)

References

External links
 
 Artstetten Castle

 
Chotek family
House of Habsburg-Lorraine